Kick In may refer to:

 Kick In (1917 film), a lost 1917 silent film crime melodrama
 Kick In (1922 film), a 1922 American silent crime drama film
 Kick In (1931 film), a 1931 American Pre-Code drama film